An extended period of significant tornado activity affected the Central United States in late May 2016. This outbreak sequence came less than two weeks after another damaging tornado outbreak that affected similar areas. The most prolific day was May 24 when 44 tornadoes touched down with at least 12 of them spawned by an intense, long-tracked supercell near Dodge City, Kansas. The strongest tornado from this outbreak was a violent EF4 tornado on May 25 that caused severe damage near Solomon, Abilene, and Chapman, Kansas, injuring eight. Overall, 98 tornadoes were confirmed.

Meteorological synopsis 

During the week of May 22–27, a southwards dip in the jet stream occurred in the West near Colorado, with favorable thermodynamics advecting northwards and setting the potential for a tornado outbreak. In the early afternoon of May 22, an Enhanced risk was issued by the Storm Prediction Center for extreme southwestern Kansas, the Oklahoma Panhandle, and northern Texas. Numerous tornadoes touched down along the dryline that evening, with the strongest tornadoes touching down in Texas. This included a large, rain-wrapped EF3 tornado that destroyed homes and vehicles near Big Spring. Another EF3 tornado destroyed oil pump jacks near Garden City, while two EF2 tornadoes in the same general area snapped numerous trees and power poles and destroyed, damaged additional pump jacks, and destroyed a mobile home. Less widespread tornado activity occurred on May 23, with mainly scattered weak tornadoes occurring across central and southern Plains. However, a large nighttime wedge tornado caused EF3 damage to metal power poles near Turkey, Texas that night.

A significant outbreak of strong tornadoes affected Kansas on May 24. A single cyclic supercell produced about a dozen highly-visible tornadoes near Dodge City, with several reports of multiple tornadoes on the ground simultaneously. A total of five EF3 tornadoes and three EF2 tornadoes were confirmed in western Kansas that evening, affecting rural areas near Dodge City, Jetmore, Ness City, Lewis, and Kinsley. These tornadoes caused extensive damage to trees, power poles, vehicles, farm machinery, and a few homes. Scattered weak tornadoes were also observed across other parts of Kansas and other states as well. Less significant activity was expected on May 25, and only a few tornadoes occurred, though this included a half-mile wide EF4 wedge tornado that tracked from near Solomon to east of Chapman, Kansas. This violent tornado obliterated farm homes, debarked trees, bent railroad tracks, and mangled farm machinery and vehicles beyond recognition, though only eight minor injuries occurred along the path. Another significant outbreak of tornadoes occurred was expected to occur across Kansas on May 26, and a Moderate Risk with a 15% hatched risk area for tornadoes was issued by the Storm Prediction center. Despite this, early initiation of storms combined with an unfavorable wind profile prevented a significant outbreak from occurring. However, a high-end EF1 tornado caused considerable damage in Bryan, Texas, while EF1 and EF2 tornadoes occurred simultaneously near Navasota, resulting in heavy damage. Despite producing numerous strong to violent tornadoes, this outbreak sequence mainly affected rural areas, resulting in no fatalities and few injuries. A total of 98 tornadoes were confirmed as a result of the outbreak sequence.

Confirmed tornadoes 

Note: Four tornadoes were confirmed, but a lack of damage indicators prevented a rating on the Enhanced Fujita scale.

May 22 event

May 23 event

May 24 event

May 25 event

May 26 event

Solomon–Abilene–Chapman, Kansas

It first touched down near the Ottawa County community of Niles just after 7:07 PM local time. 

The tornado moved eastward and reached EF3 strength to the north of Solomon, where a home lost its roof and exterior walls, and numerous trees were snapped. As the tornado crossed into Dickinson County and moved through rural areas northeast of Solomon, significant weakening occurred as EF1 tree and house damage was noted along this segment of the path. Re-intensification began to occur to the south of Talmage where a two-story house had much of its second floor destroyed, sustaining EF2 damage. A nearby home sustained EF1 damage to its roof as well. The tornado strengthened further as it passed to the north of Abeline, causing significant damage. A house near the corner of Gulf Road and 2700 Avenue sustained EF3 damage and was left with only interior rooms standing, while another home and a large metal outbuilding sustained EF2 damage. 

High-end EF3 damage was noted along Hawk Road, where a large but poorly anchored home was completely flattened. The most intense damage in this area occurred at the intersection of Indy Road and 2700 Avenue, where a split-level home was completely swept away, leaving only the basement behind. Anchor bolts were present at this location, though the home's subflooring was poorly anchored, and an EF4 rating was applied. Outbuildings were also destroyed in the vicinity, and a two-story farm home sustained lesser damage. Further to the east, the tornado narrowed and weakened back to EF1 strength as it passed through areas to the northeast of Abeline, causing mainly minor tree damage. However, it strengthened back to EF2 intensity as it crossed Interstate 70, snapping and denuding numerous large trees. 

The tornado then reached its peak strength as it passed just southwest of Chapman, which was placed under a tornado emergency, producing EF4 damage as it crossed Old Highway 40. A few farmsteads in this area were damaged or destroyed, including one where a large, anchor-bolted brick farm home was completely leveled and largely swept away. Only the basement and a pile of debris was left behind at this location. Part of the concrete foundation was severely cracked from the force of the house being ripped away, leaving rebar exposed. However, the area around the house foundation was not swept clean of debris, preventing a rating higher than EF4. 

Several vehicles and large pieces of heavy farm machinery in the vicinity were thrown and mangled beyond recognition. Numerous large trees were also denuded and debarked in this area, outbuildings were obliterated, and a set of railroad tracks was bent horizontally by the force of the tornado. While officially rated mid-range EF4, NWS Topeka damage surveyors noted that based on the damage that occurred in rural areas, an EF5 rating may have been necessary had the tornado hit any towns directly. The tornado began to weaken as it passed south of Chapman, causing extensive tree damage and inflicting low-end EF3 damage to a large farm house. To the southeast of Chapman, a home was shifted off of its foundation at EF1 intensity before the tornado dissipated shortly after 8:30 PM. The tornado reached a maximum width of one half-mile wide along its path, and damaged or destroyed roughly 20 homes in Dickinson County. No fatalities and eight minor injuries occurred as a result of this tornado.

See also
List of North American tornadoes and tornado outbreaks

Notes

References

Tornadoes of 2016
2016 natural disasters in the United States
May 2016 events